This is a list of Airdrieonians F.C. seasons in Scottish football, from their foundation in 1878 to their dissolution in 2002. It details the club's achievements in senior league and cup competitions and the top scorers for each season. The list of top scorers also chronicles how the club's scoring records have progressed throughout the club's history.

The original Airdrieonians were formed in 1878 as Excelsior F.C. The club soon became members of the Scottish Football Association and initially began competing in the Scottish Cup and Qualifying Cup, before joining the Scottish Football League in 1895.

The Diamonds won the Scottish Cup in 1923–24, beating Hibernian in the final, and were also runners-up three times, in 1974–75 (losing to Celtic), in 1991–92 (to Rangers) and in 1994–95 (again to Celtic).

They were never champions of the Scottish League but finished second four times in succession between 1923 and 1926 in what was their most successful period. During the 1990s, in addition to the Scottish Cup final appearances (the first of which earned them a place in the 1992–93 European Cup Winners' Cup) they also reached the semi-finals of the Scottish League Cup in the same seasons, but lost on penalties both times. Those were two of six occasions where Airdrie reached the penultimate stage of the League Cup, but they never made it to the showpiece match in that competition.

In 1994 the club moved from their Broomfield Park home after 102 years. They spent four seasons as tenants of Clyde at Broadwood Stadium in Cumbernauld. The burden of the construction cost of their new all-seater ground (the Excelsior Stadium) was made worse with the deterioration of their supporter base due to lack of investment in the playing staff and the years playing away from their home town, which placed severe financial strain on the club. Despite managing to remain in the second tier for nine successive seasons and win the lower-division Scottish Challenge Cup two years running, they were dissolved in 2002 due to debt.

Local businessmen subsequently took control of struggling Clydebank, renamed them Airdrie United and relocated the team to Airdrie for 2002–03, changing the playing colours to those of the original Airdrieonians but retaining the league place of Clydebank. In 2013, the new club was allowed to call themselves Airdrieonians F.C. and use a close approximation of the historic entity's badge; however they are not a legal continuation of the 1878 club.

Seasons

League performance summary 
The Scottish Football League was founded in 1890 and, other than during seven years of hiatus during World War II, the national top division has been played every season since. The following is a summary of Airdrieonians' divisional status until their dissolution in 2002:

105 total eligible seasons
60 seasons in top level
41 seasons in second level
0 seasons in third level
0 seasons in fourth level
4 seasons not involved – before club was league member

References

Sources
Soccerbase
FitbaStats
Football Club History Database

Airdrieonians F.C.
Airdrieonians F.C. (1878)